"Burn for You" is a song by Australian rock band INXS that features on the band's fourth album The Swing. It was the third single to be released from the album and peaked at #3 on the Australian chart in August 1984, remaining there for two weeks.

Track listing
7" single Track listing

12"/CD Maxi single Track listing

Video
The video was filmed by Richard Lowenstein, over a week of the band while on tour in the style of a home movie, in Mackay in North Queensland. Hutchence asked Lowenstein to come to Queensland to direct after seeing his work on the video for the Hunters & Collectors single "Talking to a Stranger". It was the first of fifteen videos that Lowenstein directed for the band. The video won Best Promotional Video at the 1984 Countdown Music and Video Awards, while the band won Best Group Performance in a Video.

Charts

Weekly charts

Year-end charts

References

INXS songs
1984 singles
Songs written by Andrew Farriss
Songs written by Michael Hutchence
Song recordings produced by Nile Rodgers
1984 songs
Warner Music Group singles